James Brown Arena (formerly known as Augusta-Richmond County Civic Center) is a multi-purpose complex located in Augusta, Georgia. It is managed by Spectra Experiences.

It features an 8,000-seat arena, renamed the James Brown Arena, in honor of musician James Brown on August 22, 2006. The complex also features a 2,800-seat theater, the William B. Bell Auditorium, and a  exhibit hall that opens into a  arena floor.

The James Brown Arena is the former home of the ECHL's Augusta Lynx from 1998–2008, the AF2's Augusta Stallions from 2000–2002, Augusta Spartans from 2006-2007, and the Southern Professional Hockey League's Augusta RiverHawks from 2010–2013.

The Arena hosted UFC 11.

The arena has also hosted many concerts and pro wrestling events, including ECW's December to Dismember in 2006. Many bands have played the arena including Van Halen, Rush, Heart, Bob Seger, REO Speedwagon, KISS, Bon Jovi, Molly Hatchet, John Cougar, Kansas, Charlie Daniels Band, Alabama, Blackfoot, Mother's Finest, Ratt, Mötley Crüe, Def Leppard, Cheap Trick, Marshall Tucker Band, and Loverboy.

The center-hung Fair Play scoreboard dates to the arena's opening in 1980, and in recent years has been joined by additional scoreboards and a Trans-Lux LED video display which can be found at each end of the arena.

The Future of the Arena 

In August 2017, the Augusta-Richmond County Coliseum Authority voted 4-2 to relocate the James Brown Arena to the former Regency Mall location off on Gordon Highway in South Augusta. The proposed site called for a new development at the Regency Mall site called Regency Town Center & Park. The development would feature a new James Brown Arena, new retail shops and restaurants, and new apartments as well. Augusta Mayor Hardie Davis was a key proponent of the move as he pushed for more redevelopment efforts in the Gordon Highway area in an area he called SOGO (South of Gordon Highway). Soon following the Coliseum Authority's vote, local residents launched the "Save The J" campaign which advocated for keeping the James Brown Arena at its current location in Downtown Augusta.

Augusta commissioners voted down the proposed site in a December 2017 before ultimately deciding to put the question of the new JBA location on the Republican and Democratic primary ballots as a non-binding referendum in May 2018.
Augustans voted 57% to 43% to keep the JBA at its current location in Downtown Augusta.

Plans soon began to be developed for a new James Brown Arena to be constructed on the current site before plans were revealed in early 2021 for a new arena. The new arena plans call for a 10,000 seat capacity featuring meeting rooms, twelve suites, and a new connector between the Bell Auditorium and the James Brown Arena all with an estimated cost of $228 million for construction.

The new James Brown Arena was on the November 2021 ballot for a bond referendum vote. Had the bond referendum passed, the estimated time of completion would have been Fall 2024. Despite low voter turnout, the bond referendum was rejected, forcing the Coliseum Authority to look for alternate sources of funding.

Incidents
In late February 2013, the arena's ice system malfunctioned, causing all of the arena's ice to melt. As a result, following the playing of the remaining 2012-13 regular season home games at the RiverHawks practice facility, the Augusta RiverHawks suspended operations for the 2013-14 season. After team owner Bob Kerzner, the city of Augusta, and Global Spectrum failed to reach an agreement on how to replace the $1.2 million ice system as well as compensation for the remaining home games lost to the system's failure, Kerzner and the SPHL announced that the RiverHawks would move to Macon and resume play as the Macon Mayhem for the 2015-16 SPHL season.

On November 18, 2022, the arena was evacuated before a concert was scheduled to begin after a gas leak was discovered, which resulted in the death of a maintenance worker who was servicing the arena's HVAC system.

See also

James Brown statue
Imperial Theatre (Augusta, Georgia)

References

External links

 
 Augusta-Richmond County Civic Center at Pei Cobb Freed & Partners Architects LLP

1980 establishments in Georgia (U.S. state)
Concert halls in the United States
Convention centers in Georgia (U.S. state)
Indoor ice hockey venues in the United States
James Brown
Sports venues in Augusta, Georgia
Indoor arenas in Georgia (U.S. state)
Sports venues completed in 1980